Inland Empire is a geographic region in Southern California, once referred to as the Orange Empire.

Inland Empire may also refer to:

Geography
 Inland Empire (Pacific Northwest), a geographic region encompassing Eastern Washington and North Idaho
 Inland Empire State, a nickname for Illinois, perhaps in rivalry with New York, the Empire State; see

Arts, entertainment, and media
 Inland Empire (film), a 2006 film directed by David Lynch
 Inland Empire Magazine, a lifestyle magazine focused on topics related to the Inland Empire in Southern California

Sports
 Inland Empire 66ers of San Bernardino, a California League baseball team
 Inland Empire Ravens, a team in the Women's Football Alliance in Riverside, California